Leila Gardner von Meister (1871 - 1957) was an Anglo-American author.

Life and career
Trapmann was born in 1871 in Sunbury-on-Thames to German-American plantation owners from Charleston, South Carolina.

Trapmann wrote and illustrated The Spoofah and the Antidote in 1898.

In 1900, Trapmann married German politician Karl Wilhelm von Meister at St Peters Church in London. They celebrated their silver wedding anniversary 25 years later.

Trapmann and Meister had their first child, Friedrich Wilhelm von Meister on 19 July 1903. Kaiser Wilhelm II telegrammed the family expressing his wish to become the child's godson.

Trapmann died in 1957 in the United States.

Works
The Spoofah and the Antidote (1898)
On Board the "Deutschland" (1925)
Gathered Yesterdays (1968, posthumous)

References

External links

Meister, Leila von. Hessian Biography.

1871 births
1957 deaths
19th-century English women
19th-century English writers
British diarists
British emigrants to the United States